Enos Milton Cabell (pronounced ), (born October 8, 1949) is an American former professional baseball player. He also played for the Baltimore Orioles, San Francisco Giants, Detroit Tigers, and Los Angeles Dodgers. After his playing career, Cabell served as a special assistant to the General Manager of the Houston Astros.

Biography
Cabell was born in Fort Riley, Kansas to Enos Cabell Sr. and Naomi Cabell. He graduated from Gardena High School in Gardena, California. He played college baseball at Los Angeles Harbor College.

Cabell was signed by the Baltimore Orioles as an amateur free agent in 1968. He played in Venezuelan winter league for Tigres de Aragua in season 1971-1972, with excellent performance and he's remembered with gratitude by Venezuelan fans. He was traded along with Rob Andrews from the Orioles to the Astros for Lee May and Jay Schlueter at the Winter Meetings on December 3, 1974. The Baseball Writers' Association of America named Cabell the Houston Astros' Most Valuable Player in 1978. On December 8, 1980, Cabell was then traded to San Francisco for pitcher Bob Knepper and outfielder Chris Bourjos.

On February 28, 1986, Cabell and six others were suspended for the entire season for admitting during the Pittsburgh drug trials that they were involved in cocaine abuse. The suspensions for all seven were avoided after agreeing to large anti-drug donations and community service.

He played MLB for 15 seasons, despite the distinction of being singled out by Bill James in his 1983 Baseball Abstract as a player who "can't play baseball." Currently, he serves as a special assistant to Astros general manager James Click.

Career statistics
In 1,688 games over 15 seasons, Cabell compiled a .277 batting average (1,647–for–5,952) with 753 runs, 263 doubles, 56 triples, 60 home runs, 596 RBI, 238 stolen bases, 259 base on balls, 691 strikeouts, .308 on-base percentage, and .370 slugging percentage. Defensively, he recorded a .977 fielding percentage. In the postseason, he batted .184 (7–for–38) in 13 league championship games.

Trademark lawsuit
In December 2008, Tennessee Titans quarterback Vince Young filed suit against Cabell and two others for applying for a trademark to use Young's initials and the "Invincible" nickname to sell products without Young's permission in 2006. The suit claimed that their use of Young's name damaged endorsement deals for Young; he asked the court to give him the exclusive rights to use the initials and nickname. Cabell denied any wrongdoing.

See also
 Houston Astros award winners and league leaders
 List of Major League Baseball career stolen bases leaders

References

External links

Baseball Almanac
Enos Cabell - Baseballbiography.com
Retrosheet
Pura Pelota

1949 births
Living people
American sportspeople in doping cases
African-American baseball players
Baltimore Orioles players
Baseball players from Kansas
Bluefield Orioles players
Cardenales de Lara players
American expatriate baseball players in Venezuela
Dallas–Fort Worth Spurs players
Detroit Tigers players
Gardena High School alumni
Houston Astros announcers
Houston Astros players
Los Angeles Dodgers players
Los Angeles Harbor Seahawks baseball players
Major League Baseball broadcasters
Major League Baseball first basemen
Major League Baseball players suspended for drug offenses
Major League Baseball third basemen
People from Fort Riley, Kansas
Rochester Red Wings players
San Francisco Giants players
Stockton Ports players
Tigres de Aragua players
21st-century African-American people
20th-century African-American sportspeople